General elections were held in East Germany on 8 June 1986. 500 deputies were elected to the Volkskammer, with all of them being candidates of the single-list National Front. 703 Front candidates were put forward, with 500 being elected and 203 becoming substitute deputies. At its first session on 16 June, the Volkskammer re-elected Willi Stoph as Chairman of the Council of Ministers, while Erich Honecker, General Secretary of the ruling Socialist Unity Party, was also re-elected Chairman of the State Council.

This would be the last election held in East Germany before the Peaceful Revolution in 1989, three years into the Volkskammer's term.

Results

See also
List of Volkskammer members (9th election period)

References

General
 Peter W. Sperlich. Oppression and Scarcity: The History and Institutional Structure of the Marxist-Leninist Government of East Germany and Some Perspectives on Life in a Socialist System. Westport, CT: Greenwood Publishing Group. 2006. p. 46.
 Richard Felix Staar. Communist Regimes in Eastern Europe. Fifth Edition. California: Hoover Institution Press. 1988. p. 104.

1986 in East Germany
Elections in East Germany
1986 elections in Germany
June 1986 events in Europe
East Germany